Jennifer Wood may refer to:

 Jenny Wood, swimmer who competed in the 1964 Olympics
 Jennifer Wood (gymnast), Canadian Olympic gymnast